is a passenger railway station located in the city of Kazo, Saitama, Japan, operated by the private railway operator Tōbu Railway.

Lines
Section Express, Section Semi Express, and Local all-stations services stop at this station. Some limited express Ryomo services also stop here.

Station layout
This station has an elevated station building, with one island platform and one side platform serving three tracks located on the ground level.

Platforms

History
Kazo Station opened on 6 September 1902. A new elevated station building was completed on 22 November 1985.

From 17 March 2012, station numbering was introduced on all Tōbu lines, with Kazo Station becoming "TI-05".

Passenger statistics
In fiscal 2019, the station was used by an average of 13,569 passengers daily.

Surrounding area
 Kazo City Hall
 Kazo Post Office
 Kazo City Chamber of Commerce

See also
List of railway stations in Japan

References

External links

 KazoStation information (Tobu) 

Tobu Isesaki Line
Stations of Tobu Railway
Railway stations in Saitama Prefecture
Railway stations in Japan opened in 1902
Kazo, Saitama